Never Will is the fourth studio album by American country music singer-songwriter Ashley McBryde. It was released on April 3, 2020 via Warner Music Nashville. The album is McBryde's second major label release and was preceded by the lead single "One Night Standards". McBryde launched the One Night Standards Tour in support of the album on January 30, 2020.

Never Will was nominated for the Grammy Award for Best Country Album and the Country Music Association Award for Album of the Year.

Release and promotion
The album's title, track listing and release date were revealed on January 17, 2020.

Singles
The first single from the album, "One Night Standards", was released on August 30, 2019. It impacted country radio on September 23, 2019. The music video was released on December 19.

Two additional songs—"Martha Divine" and "Hang in There Girl"—were released ahead of the album as promotional singles in January 2020. Both were accompanied by music videos that made up a chronological 3-part series beginning with the video for "One Night Standards".

Tour
Beginning January 30, 2020, McBryde launched the One Night Standards Tour to support the album.

Critical reception

Never Will was met with widespread critical acclaim. At Metacritic, which assigns a weighted average rating out of 100 to reviews from professional publications, the album received an average score of 83, based on 7 reviews.

American Songwriter reviewer Hal Horowitz applauded the music, regarding it as "a rock/country hybrid that's more visceral than, well, country/rock, and hits harder too". On the other hand, Robert Christgau lamented "the production here: Nashville rock at its bigged-up schlockiest, with McBryde belting to match", but applauded the songwriting as "compact", engaging, and "so sharp it gives her the right to belt: lyrically not one of the 11 tracks is merely passable". Jonathan Bernstein from Rolling Stone similarly praised the lyrics, calling McBryde "one of country's sharpest truth-tellers".

Accolades

Track listing

Personnel
Adapted from AllMusic

Blue Foley - background vocals
Jason Hall- background vocals
Chris Harris - acoustic guitar, mandolin, background vocals
Matt Helmkamp - electric guitar, background vocals
Quinn Hill - drums, percussion, background vocals
Jay Joyce - Farfisa organ, acoustic guitar, electric guitar, keyboards, piano, programming, background vocals
Jimmy Mansfield - background vocals
Ashley McBryde - acoustic guitar, electric guitar, lead vocals, background vocals
Chris Sancho - bass guitar, background vocals
Trick Savage - background vocals
Dan Smalley - background vocals

Charts

References

Ashley McBryde albums
Warner Records albums
Albums produced by Jay Joyce
2020 albums